The Little Vampire (German-language version title: Der kleine Vampir) is a children's television series created in 1985 (first aired in 1986) by the German Polyphon Film- und Fernsehgesellschaft, TVS (United Kingdom) and Canadian Norflicks Productions Ltd. The series is based upon the books written by Angela Sommer-Bodenburg.

Synopsis
Anton Besker is a 10-year-old boy who suddenly meets a boy, named Rüdiger, in his bedroom. Although Rüdiger seems to be the same age as Anton, he claims to be a 146-year-old vampire. Rüdiger explains a vampire can choose his age when he mutates. They then stay this age forever. He and his sister Anna chose to be children as Anna was afraid to not have teeth. He and his sister live in a hidden crypt on the old part of the local cemetery.

Anton and Rüdiger become friends but can only meet after sunset and before sunrise. Initially, they enjoy flying. Flying is not a vampire ability but they are able to fly by using a "flying powder" called "rants". Any cloth on which flying powder is sprinkled will fly and carry anything that is attached to it. For security reasons, the flying powder should only be used on vampire cloaks. So, Anton can fly by wearing such a cloak and sprinkling flying powder on it.

There are a few important rules: 
Anton must not reveal that vampires do exist, although he writes all his adventures in letters that he sends to his friend Teddy who moved out of town some weeks before. However, Teddy thinks the adventures are tales made up by Anton. 
Other vampires, except Anna and Lumpi, must not know Anton is a human. 
Vampires must hide from vampire hunters such as Johann Geiermeier, the handyman and gravedigger of the local cemetery

In the story, Geiermeier is hunting the vampires  and has a plan to destroy them. Thanks to Anton, the vampires escape.

Names:

Episodes
1. "Nächtlicher Besuch" (A visit at night)
The little vampire Rüdiger is bored and his uncle Theodor/Ludwig sends him to town. There, Rüdiger sees Anton at the sports centre. Anton is just picked up by his mother whom he tells he is bored since his friend Teddy moved out of town. Rüdiger follows them so he knows where they live. Some time later, Rüdiger knocks on Anton's bedroom window. Anton, first afraid, disarrays his room which is heard by Mrs. Perkins, the babysitter (as his parents Helga and Robert had to go to a party). The sitter takes a look in Anton's bedroom, but Rüdiger is able to hide in time. Anton's fear passes away and the two become good friends. At end of the episode, Johann Geiermeier arrives by plane. He is the new handyman and gravedigger of the local cemetery as well as a vampire hunter.

2. "Fliegen will gelernt sein" (Flying you should learn)
As Helga and Robert have to go to a party, Anton invited Rüdiger to his bedroom. Unfortunately, Helga wrenched her ankle and should stay in bed. Rüdiger has a surprise: Anton will learn how to fly. Anton is first afraid he will be mutated into a vampire, but Rüdiger explains everyone can fly by using a smelly "flying powder". They practise in the bedroom, but Anton throws over some stuff. This is heard by Helga who enters the bedroom. Rüdiger is able to hide in time. Helga finds the cloak worn by Anton. He explains the cloak belongs to a friend who came over and forgot to take it with him. Vampire hunter Johann Geiermeier moves into his new house (Helga being the real estate agent). While he plays the tuba uncle Theodor/Ludwig spies on him.

3. "Bei Schlottersteins" (At the Schlottersteins)
Next morning, uncle Theoder/Ludwig says he is 100% sure the new gravedigger is a Geiermeier. He acts as a Geiermeier, is dressed like a Geiermeier, smells like a Geiermeier and presented himself as a Geiermeier during a phone conversation.

That night, Anton's parents have to go out again. As his usual sitter is ill, she sends over her daughter Effie Perkins. Rüdiger scares Effie who runs out of the house. Rüdiger takes Anton to his crypt. At the cemetery, they can just escape from Geiermeier. Once in the crypt, aunt Dorothee/Hildegard wakes up. Anton hides in Rüdiger's coffin, although Dorothee/Hildegard can smell human flesh and suspects Rüdiger to have hidden a human in his coffin. Rüdiger distracts aunt Dorothee/Hildegard so Anton can escape.

Helga finds the smelly vampire cloak in Anton's room and takes it.

4. Vampirumhänge wäscht man nicht (Vampire cloaks should not be washed)
By next morning, Helga has washed the cloak. She asks Anton to take the cloak to Rüdiger and to invite him and his sister for dinner. At the cemetery, Anton tries to fly in, but he does not succeed. His classmate Udo/Cyril is a witness and tries to figure out what Anton is doing. They are surprised by Geiermeier who recognizes the cloak as a vampire's. He interrogates Anton and Udo/Cyril about the cloak. Udo/Cyril escapes with the cloak to his house. At night Anton visits Rüdiger, who is upset as Anton lost the cloak. The good news is the cloak has been washed so the flying powder disappeared. Rüdiger visits a punk party where his cousin Lumpi, also a vampire, sings as lead of the staging group.

5. Annas Trick (Anna's trick)
Geiermeier sits behind his desk and writes his family chronicles. He describes the numerous disguises he used to find vampires. At last he had the splendid idea to become a gravedigger. At the same time, Rüdiger arrives at Anton's house. He is accompanied by his sister Anna. She will help to retrieve the cloak as Rüdiger has other things to do that night. Anna falls in love with Anton. Both go to Udo/Cyril. Whilst Anton keeps Udo/Cyril on a string, Anna slips into the house and retrieves the cloak: Anton had tricked Udo/Cyril to go into his room to make sure the cloak was still there, but Anna was watching.

When Anton enters his own bedroom, Anna is already there, having sprinkled flying powder over the cloak. When Helga is about to enter the bedroom, Anna hides and Anton puts the cloak under the bed. By doing this, some of the flying powder falls onto the duvet. After Helga leaves the room, the bedsheets (and Anton) start to fly. Thanks to Anna, Anton lands safely. Both go to the crypt to tell Rüdiger the cloak is back in possession. Anton is disappointed as it turns out Rüdiger is playing games with Lumpi. Suddenly, aunt Dorothee/Hildegard and uncle Theodor/Ludwig walk in. Anton hides in Rüdiger's coffin. When they are finally away, Anna finds an unconscious Anton and needs to perform a mouth to mouth respiration. Some hours later, Helga finds a sleeping Anton beside the washing machine. Inside the machine the duvet from his bed.

6. Rüdiger in Jeans (Rüdiger in jeans)
It's almost the day where Rüdiger and Anna are expected at Anton's house. One major problem: Rüdiger and Anna can't go in their vampire clothes. The solution for Rüdiger is easy: Anton lends him some of his old clothes: a jeans and a shirt. Anna remembers a dress she saw in Udo/Cyril's house. She decides to burgle the dress. Geiermeier finds a rare file in the library about vampires. As the file is not to be loaned, he steals it. However, he is caught and taken away by the police. Rüdiger and Anna dress up in the crypt and are about to go to Anton. They do not notice they are overheard by aunt Dorothee/Hildegard.

7. Tee mit Überraschungen (Tea with surprises)
Helga worries about the invitees. Rüdiger and Anna were to be expected at 16:00 and it is almost 16:30. Anton explains they will only arrive after 20:00. Finally, Rüdiger and Anna ring the bell. They wear human clothes and make up to hide they are vampires. The whole party is overseen by aunt Dorothee/Hildegard, uncle Theodor/Ludwig and Lumpi. While it is no surprise that Anna drinks milk, they believe both ate bread due to mimed chewing (although Anton quickly wolfed most of each sandwich), and Rudiger is seen apparently drinking tea (it is consommé soup). Even Lumpi is shocked when he discovers Rüdiger consumes the regular human food. Theodor/Ludwig suspects they are not vampires.

By coincidence, Anton notices the spies and informs Anna and Rüdiger. Rüdiger is afraid they will be banned from the crypt and decides to go home. Robert insists he drive the children there by car. By directions of Rüdiger, Robert drops them off at a house which they enter. As soon as Robert drives away, the little vampires run out of the house towards the cemetery. There, they are caught by Geiermeier who recognizes them as vampires. Luckily, they are still being spied upon by Dorothee/Hildegard, Theodor/Ludwig and Lumpi who can save Rüdiger and Anna.

Once in the crypt, the interrogation starts: contact with humans should be avoided, none of them should know about vampires being real, and it is strictly forbidden to consume human food. Anna is dismissed as she never wanted to be a vampire and abominates blood. That's why she does drink milk. Rüdiger is banned. He gets a fly prohibition, must turn in his cloak and must find another place to stay.

8. Rüdiger in Not (Rüdiger in peril)
Rüdiger has to spend that night outside, but by the next evening, he has arranged with Anton to have his coffin in the locker room at Anton's building.  Rüdiger asks Anton to turn in his cloak so Rüdiger can fly to a place where he is not known. During this conversation Effie finds the cloak in Anton's room and takes it away. A few minutes later, Anton notices the theft and knows Effie is the wrongdoer. He goes to her house and finds the cloak in the washing machine. As a result, Rüdiger can't escape.

9. Unruhe im Keller (Troubles in the cellar)
Rüdiger is still hiding in Anton's cellar and is frequently visited by his sister Anna. She tells him that the family questions whether they made the correct decision or not. Anna invites Anton to the "Big Vampire Party" which will take place in a few days. She is disappointed when it turns out Rüdiger already invited Anton - insisting Anton come to reciprocate - and last one accepted. Meanwhile, Geiermeier is at the cemetery and speaks towards the (hidden) vampires: he promises the vampires a fair trial in Transylvania and he announces he has a genius plan which no vampire could survive. The police notice Geiermeier and brings him over to a psychiatric hospital. However, Geiermeier is able to escape and needs to hide now. Anton has also borrowed the locker key and obtained a copy of it for Rüdiger.

Anna gives Rüdiger some flying powder which she secretly took from the crypt. Helga asks Anton to help his father in the cellar. Anton runs there to be the first. He finds a newspaper with a photo. The photo displays Anton and Teddy dressed up as vampires. Rüdiger learns Teddy now lives in Hamelin and flies over. There he finds Teddy, but decides not to introduce himself. Teddy is writing a letter to Anton which is taken away by Rüdiger. Rüdiger delivers the letter to Anton. Anton finishes the letter by telling Teddy everything he wrote is the truth. Next, he mails the letter to Teddy.

10. Das große Fest der Vampire (The Big Vampire Party)
Anton heard on the news bulletin Geiermeier got approval to destroy the old graveyard. He wants to inform Rüdiger that action needs to be taken to rescue the vampires or to halt the works. Rüdiger refuses at this time to even hear such news, as the Big Vampire Party will take place next night. During the party all mistakes are forgiven. Anna will soon bring over his cloak as his fly prohibition has already been ended. Anton dresses up as a vampire, while Rüdiger arrives by walking up the stairs to the door. Helga takes the picture of the "two" vampires after "touching up" Rüdiger's "makeup".

Just before they depart, Udo/Cyril turns up. He is also dressed up as a vampire and made his own cloak. He wants Anton and Rüdiger to go to the cemetery and to teach him how to fly. At the cemetery Udo/Cyril is picked up by the police whilst Rüdiger and Anton can escape. They fly to the party which takes place in a big cave. Rüdiger introduces Anton as "Thor the Awful". Anton gets to know Dorothee/Hildegard and Theodor/Ludwig better, but suddenly gets the question of where he lives. Anton answers: "I live where I drop my cloak". Dorothee/Hildegard interprets this as Anton being a gipsy, a folk which she admires. It turns out Theodor/Ludwig is the king of the vampires and Dorothee/Hildegard also has much power. Rüdiger reveals he also got a nickname: Rüdiger the Exterminator.

11. Geiermeier ist überall (Geiermeier is everywhere)
The party is still on. The vampires enjoy many different dance styles, including vampire-themed square dancing, and break dancing.

Because he fell into water, Anton's make up is partially gone so he needs to leave as soon as possible. It is, however, inappropriate to leave early. That's why Rüdiger tells his aunt that Thor is going to get his violin to play some songs for her. In the underground alleys they meet Geiermeier, also dressed as a vampire. He is on the run from the police. He also was present at the vampire party where he stole a vampire cloak to prove such cloaks and vampires do exist. To save Anton, they are forced to take Geiermeier with them. Once outside the caves, Rüdiger and Anna can retrieve the stolen cloak. Anton runs towards his house.

12. "Transportprobleme" (Transport problems)
Rüdiger still hides in Anton's cellar. Anton informs him the demolition works started and the vampire family is in great danger. As it is day, Rüdiger can't help his family so Anton is forced to enter the crypt to tell the news. Once in the crypt he confesses not to be "Thor the Awful", but a regular human child. Theodor/Ludwig is about to kill Anton, but Anna persuades him to listen. Anton tells about the demolition. Theodor/Ludwig gives him the task to rent a boat at the "harbour" so they can escape the next night. As reward, the boat's "captain" will get gold. Anton finds a captain (Bruno Gerussi) who is willing to carry the vampires. Theodor/Ludwig now understands what Geiermeier meant with his previous speech.

13. Kein Abschied ist für immer (Farewell is not forever)
Rüdiger is back in the family. They are almost ready to move out, although they do not know how to transport their coffins. Anton and Rüdiger say it is Hallowe'en and they won't look odd. Lumpi calls his human punk friends, and together, they proceed calmly through the streets toting seven coffins (the family's plus two others). They are, however, halted by police at Geiermeier's urging. A policeman points to Theodor/Ludwig to step forward, but Anton steps forward instead to be discovered to be human, at which point the attentive police officer recognizes Geiermeier as the escaped lunatic, so Geiermeier runs away. Anna, Rüdiger and Anton have to say farewell. Anton gets a present: a bottle of flying powder. Dorothee/Hildegard reveals Anton might create his own powder if he takes a good smell, and tries to indicate the ingredients. Just before the ship leaves, Theodor/Ludwig notices there is one extra coffin. Inside the coffin is Geiermeier who tries to come after the vampires. Geiermeier admits he is jealous about the vampires: they live forever whilst he is going to die sooner or later. Geiermeier surrenders and stops his activities as a vampire hunter.

Teddy arrives on the train the very next day to visit Anton.  An "Everything is Forgiven" party is held at the Besker home.  Later that night, Mr. Besker finds a letter on Anton's bedroom window: it is from Rüdiger telling he only lives one night's flying from Anton so they still can meet each other. To prove Anton's stories are real, he sprinkles flying powder on the bed sheets. Both boys fly on the sheets a few seconds later.

Main differences from the books
In the series the crypt is inhabited by Rüdiger, Anna, Lumpi, aunt Dorothee and uncle Theodor. In the books, Rüdiger, Anna, Lumpi and Dorothee are joined by Rüdiger's parents ("Ludwig der Fürchterliche" and "Hildegard die Durstige") and his grandparents ("Sabine die Schreckliche" and "Wilhelm der Wüste"). Later on, also Olga von Schlotterstein-Seifenschwein installs in the crypt.
According to the books, uncle Theodor already was killed before the story starts. Theodor was caught by Geiermeier when he was playing the cards on his coffin. After the incident, the family moved to an underground secret crypt.
In the books, Lumpi is the elder brother of Rüdiger and Anna. In the series he is their cousin, the son of Dorothee and cousin of Rüdiger and Anna.
In the series uncle Theodor is king of the vampires. In the books, Count Dracula is the worldwide king. The leader of the German vampires is Elisabeth die Naschhafte. At end of the stories, she is followed up by Anna.
In the series, Lumpi does have human friends, who are punks, allowing Lumpi to blend in. In the books, Lumpi is leader of a male vampire youth club.
In the books, Anton, his father and grandfather have the same name: Anton Bohnsack.

See also
List of English-language Canadian television series
List of German television series
Vampire film
List of vampire television series

References

External links

1986 Canadian television series debuts
1987 Canadian television series endings
German children's television series
Canadian television shows based on children's books
Television shows based on German novels
Television series about children
Television series about vampires
1980s Canadian children's television series